"Love, Peace And Happiness" was a hit for The Chambers Brothers in 1970. It appeared on the album of the same name.

Background
The single was released on Columbia 4-45088, backed with a Spyder Turner composition, " If You Want Me To". It was released in the UK on Direction  58-4846.  
Following the formula of their earlier hit, "Time Has Come Today" with its longer album version and the shorter single version, "Love Peace And Happiness" did the same.

Chart history
It peaked in the US at #96 in February, 1970.

Referenced
In Dewey Starbuck's Secret of the Skulls: Eyes of Time, Volume 2, the song was referred to as having cool words and great rhythm.

References

The Chambers Brothers songs
1970 singles
Columbia Records singles
1970 songs